This is a list of all cricketers who have captained the Netherlands in an official international match. This includes the ICC Trophy, Under 19's games and One Day Internationals, Twenty20 Internationals. This article is correct as of 21 August 2022.

One Day Internationals

The Netherlands played their first ODI on February 17, 1996.

Twenty20 International

The Netherlands played their first T20 on August 2, 2008.

ICC Trophy

The Netherlands debuted in the ICC Trophy in the 1979 tournament

Youth One-Day International captains

This is a list of Dutch cricketers who have captained their country in an Under-19's ODI.

Women's Test captains

This is a list of Dutch cricketers who have captained their country in a Women's Test.

Women's ODI captains

This is a list of Dutch cricketers who have captained their country in a Women's ODI.

Women's T20I captains

This is a list of Dutch cricketers who have captained their country in a Women's T20I.

References

External links
Cricinfo ODI
Cricinfo T20
Netherlands's ICC Trophy captains at Cricket Archive 
Netherlands' Under 19's captains at Cricket Archive 

Dutch
Netherlands in international cricket
Captains